Varoom may refer to:

Varoom!, a 1963 pop art painting by Roy Lichtenstein
"(Varoom!)", a 1992 song by Stereolab from the EP Low Fi
Varoom (Pokémon), a Pokémon species

See also
 Vroom (disambiguation)